This is a list of governors of Wyoming, beginning with territorial governors. Wyoming Territory was organized in 1868, and the state was admitted to the union on July 10, 1890. 

The gubernatorial term has been set at four years since statehood. Originally, a governor could be elected any number of times. Since a 1992 referendum, governors have been limited to eight years in office during any 16-year period—effectively limiting them to two consecutive terms.

Governors

Governors of the Territory of Wyoming

Governors of the State of Wyoming

Notes

Succession

Lists of state governors of the United States

Governors